Xyris brevifolia, the shortleaf yelloweyed grass,  is a North American species of flowering plant in the yellow-eyed-grass family. It is native to Brazil, the West Indies, and the southeastern United States (Florida, Alabama, Georgia, and the Carolinas).

Xyris brevifolia  is a perennial herb up to 60 cm (2 feet) tall with narrow leaves  up to 15 cm (6 inches) long, and yellow flowers.

References

brevifolia
Plants described in 1803
Flora of the Southeastern United States
Flora of Brazil
Flora of the Caribbean